Zhou Weijuan (born 3 January 1986) is a Chinese lightweight rower.

At the 2003 World Rowing U23 Championships in Belgrade, Serbia, she won a gold medal in the lightweight women's double sculls partnered with Wang Yanni. Five weeks later at the 2003 World Rowing Championships in Milan, Italy, she won a gold medal in the lightweight women's quadruple sculls. At the next world championships in 2004 in Banyoles in Catalonia, Spain, she defended her world championship title in that boat class.

References

Chinese female rowers
1986 births
Living people
World Rowing Championships medalists for China